Frederick Eustace Batten (29 September 1865 – 27 July 1918) was an English neurologist and pediatrician who has been referred to as the "father of pediatric neurology".

Biography
Frederick Batten was born on 29 September 1865 in Plymouth. He attended Westminster School and Trinity College, Cambridge, and graduated in medicine in 1891 from St Bartholomew's Hospital Medical College in London. He worked as a pathologist at the Hospital for Sick Children and as a physician at the National Hospital. He obtained his doctorate in 1895, became a fellow of the Royal College of Physicians in 1901, and was elected dean in 1908. Batten disease was named after him after he first described it in 1903.

Batten died from infection after a routine prostatectomy.

Eponym
Batten disease

Further reading

References

External links
 Frederick Eustace Batten (www.whonamedit.com)

1865 births
1918 deaths
19th-century English medical doctors
People educated at Westminster School, London
Alumni of the Medical College of St Bartholomew's Hospital
20th-century English medical doctors
Alumni of Trinity College, Cambridge